Rot (in its upper course Roth) is a river of Thuringia, Germany.

The Rot springs near the district  of Gotha. It is a left tributary of the Apfelstädt in Wandersleben.

See also
List of rivers of Thuringia

References

Rivers of Thuringia
Rivers of Germany